Fritz Kiölling (3 March 1896 – 3 June 1976) was a Swedish middle-distance runner. He competed in the men's 1500 metres at the 1920 Summer Olympics.

References

External links
 

1896 births
1976 deaths
Athletes (track and field) at the 1920 Summer Olympics
Swedish male middle-distance runners
Olympic athletes of Sweden
People from Bollnäs
Sportspeople from Gävleborg County